A dating agency, also known as a marriage bureau, marriage agency, matrimonial bureau or matrimonial agency, is a business which provides matchmaking services to potential couples, with a view toward romance and/or marriage between them.

Variations

Face-to-face: Men and women come in person and ask a matchmaker to help them find a potential partner. 
Internet dating agency: A website where people register, post their profiles and contact other members who have signed up with the agency.
Speed dating: A group of people rotate partners and describe their personality and desires within a set time limit.
Marriage agency: An agency that specifically helps people find a marriage partner, rather than someone to date on a casual or serious basis. These can be domestic or international in nature.

The internet and speed dating agencies are the biggest of the group.

There is a rise of businesses who teach men how they can meet women themselves without the use of a dating agency, some of which use the label pickup artist.

Both dating agencies and marriage agencies have some organizations where people are paid to interact with other members and keep their interest high. Though there are various agencies that only have members that are genuinely seeking real partners.

History and trends

18th and 19th century marriage agencies
Marriage agencies run by clergymen were introduced to England and Wales in the late 18th century, prompting considerable amusement from the social commentators of the day. In 1799 a "provincial publication says that a MATRIMONIAL PLAN is proposed to be established throughout every county, city, or town, in England or Wales. (...) The system of this curious, and it should seem actually serious, plan — as far as we can learn — is as follows: — Every person, of either sex, who desires to enter into a treaty of marriage, is first to subscribe a certain sum. All ladies and gentlemen to describe themselves, by real or fictitious names, as they may choose".

Men and women would classify themselves into three classes, and would generally state how much money they earned, or would be given as a dowry. A typical entry would read:
Second Class, No.2. — A gentleman, 40 years of age, a little corpulent, rather of a dark brown complexion, wears a wig, has a place in the Customs, and a small estate in Suffolk, with 750l. in the funds; reasonably well-tempered, and at times very lively; religion — of his fathers.

By 1825 an agency in Bishopsgate, London, opened three days a week for members of the public looking for a partner to describe themselves and subscribe to the appropriate list. However, by then both ladies and gentlemen had to classify themselves in 5 different classes.

Since World War II

Though most people meet their dates at social organizations, in their daily life and work, or are introduced through friends or relatives, commercial dating agencies emerged strongly, but discreetly, in the Western world after World War II, mostly catering for the 25–44 age group. Newspaper and magazine personal ads also became common.

Since the emergence of the Internet, mate-finding and courtship have seen changes due to online dating services and mobile dating services. Telecommunications and computer technologies have developed rapidly since around 1995, allowing daters the use of home telephones with answering machines – mobile phones – and web-based systems to find prospective partners. "Pre-dates" can take place by telephone or online via instant messaging, e-mail, or even video communication.

Many singles look for love on the Web, and research in the United Kingdom suggests that as of 2004 there were around 150 agencies in that country, where the market was apparently growing at around 20 percent a year. Academic researchers find it impossible to find precise figures about crucial statistics, such as the ratio of active daters to the large number of inactive members (whom an agency will often wrongly claim as potential partners, leaving them 'on the books' long after they have left) and the overall ratio of men to women in an agency's membership. Academic research on traditional pre-Internet agencies suggests that most such agencies had far more men than women in their membership. Due to the ratio of available single women being biased against men in the Western world, many dating and marriage agencies began to offer services over-seas. Traditionally, in many societies (including Western societies), men were expected to fill the role of the pursuer. However, the anonymity of the Internet (as well as other factors) has allowed women to take on that role online.

The trend of singles making a Web connection continues to increase, as the percentage of North American singles who have tried Internet dating has grown from two percent in 1999 to over ten percent today (from Canadian Business, February 2002). More than half of online consumers (53%) know someone who has started a friendship or relationship online, and three-quarters of 18-to-24-year-old online consumers (74%) say they do. There is also some academic evidence that the 18–25 age group has significantly taken up online dating.

Fraud
Users of online agencies or sites may be susceptible to fraud or other forms of deception. According to the FBI, almost 15,000 complaints categorized as romance scams were reported in 2016.

Real-life examples
 Heather Lyon established "The Marriage Bureau" in Bond Street, Mayfair, London, in 1939.
 Joan Ball started the Eros Friendship Bureau Ltd in 1962, renaming it the St. James Computer Dating Service in 1964.
 Ghatak Pakhi Bhai established his matrimonial agency named after him in Dhaka, Bangladesh, in 1985.

Fictional examples
 Love Is a Ball (1963). Charles Boyer plays the head of a matrimonial bureau that finds rich, unsuspecting American women for impoverished European aristocrats.

Marriage agencies 

Marriage agencies differ from dating agencies in that they are specifically for those seeking marriage.

Origins 

Marriage agencies have evolved from dating agencies. Historically their processes come from matchmaking processes that extend back to the 1600s in England, when parish vicars played an important role in matching their parishioners with a spouse from the same social class. Similar practices were used in Japan from the 16th century where Nadoko (matchmakers) would perform Omiai (marriage introduction) duties for parents seeking a worthy spouse for their child. In England religious ties were relinquished in 1825 with the advent of dating agencies in London, which became the new option to find someone suitable those who experienced challenge in meeting a marriage partner.

Recent background 
Changes in culture and society have led to changes in the marriage rate, due to views of single people regarding marriage. In 1960 around 12% of adults between the ages of 25 and 34 had never been married. 10 years later when that same group was between the ages of 35 and 44, 7% of them were still unmarried. A further 10 years later in 1980, when those people were 45 to 54, 5% were still not married. The next group starting in 1970 followed a similar path. In 1960 the marriage rate was 72% for all adults over the age of 18, in 2010 the marriage rate was 51% for the same demographic.

Part of the marriage gap has been reported as being due to people waiting until they are older, have more educational degrees, and are more financially stable. With those who have waited marrying other professionally successful individuals, their desire being indicated as wishing to pass down both educational and financial capital to their children, and ensure stability for their children.

In addition to this there is the growing trend in various developed countries of those who just wish to remain single and have their freedom or to experience what has been termed delayed adolescence. Perceived reductions in partner loyalty, lower levels of self-esteem, stronger desire for financial stability, relationship issues, and the increased trend of divorce among married couples, are often cited as causing many to question whether the partners they meet would be suitable marriage partners. In addition dating app users cite issues of trust coming from deceit and dishonest relationship intentions which block them mentally and emotionally from developing serious relationships that could lead to marriage with persons met via dating apps.

Description 

The modern marriage agency works in two principle ways to help clients find a marriage partner:

 By having a group of members specifically seeking marriage partners.
 Matchmaking.

Historically marriage agencies would usually work alone, modern marriage agencies now often work within federations or associations, enabling effects of scale that allow easier creation of marriage matches because of inter-marriage agency cooperation. This is common in Japan, where the culture along with social influences have led to marriage agencies being responsible for 5.3% of marriages in 2010 and 2014.

Matchmaking is a core activity for marriage agencies, as their members largely focus on being with someone whom they truly love and are truly compatible with due to increased levels of happiness and fulfillment derived. Marriage agencies use matchmaking to ensure the best chance of marriages being successful in the long term and short term, challenges come from how skilled matchmakers are as well as how well they know their members. While matchmaking was previously used worldwide to ensure solid alliances between families, modern marriage agency work has greater focus on the psychological aspect of how love forms between two people and their suitability for each other as life partners. Because of this marriage agencies conduct matchmaking to assess compatibility prior to introductions. This type of practice has been common in Japan since the 1940s when the Omiai marriage introduction system was changed from being family background focused to creating love matches for marriage. Matchmaking or marriage matching when done by marriage agencies is performed manually, rather than by computer algorithm which is common with dating apps. While matchmaking on dating apps works to weighted variables derived from profiles, manual matchmaking done by marriage agencies comes as a result of marriage agency matchmaking staff developing understanding of their client's personalities and desires, often paired with use of big data from searches of collective databases held between partnered marriage agencies within their federation or association.

Registering with a marriage agency requires proof of eligibility for marriage, with marriage agencies commonly requiring a Certificate of No Impediment to Marriage, Certificate of No Record of Marriage, Single Status Affidavit, or other similar legal proof of applicant's ability to marry. While such documentation is common for people when marrying overseas, it is uncommon for same country marriages in many western countries.

Marriage agency services such as coaching to help clients overcome issues such as nervousness, anxiety and psychological issues held from previous relationships, are becoming more common in order to help them achieve stable loving relationships.

Marriage agencies as distinct from dating agencies also have total focus on their clients getting married, rather than just being life partners, dating, co-habiting, or forming other beneficial relationships.

International marriage agencies 
International marriage agencies, which differ from mail-order bride services, enable clients to search worldwide for their ideal marriage partner. International marriage agency use has been fueled by increased exposure to foreign cultures worldwide. With many in western countries now seeking marriage partners from more traditional eastern cultures, Japan especially, due to cultural values of loyalty, kindness and love being core to the values that those actually desiring marriage are actually seeking, yet having trouble finding in their own countries. As such specific marriage agency types, for example Japanese marriage agencies, have come into existence in order to fulfill desire for those seeking marriage with someone from a specific geographical region or cultural system.

The increase in international marriage agencies also mirrors trends of increased intermarriage, whereby partners from differing ethnic or racial background marry. Within the U.S. only 3% of new marriages were classified as intermarriage in 1967, by 2015 intermarriage had increased to 17% with Asian forming 29% and Hispanic 27% of that figure

Marriage agency introductions changes brought by COVID-19 
Reduced contact, social distancing, lockdown and other pandemic mitigation measures, marriage agency introductions faced challenges due to COVID-19. At the same time, because of increased time at home leading to feelings of loneliness and people reassessing their lives, demand for marriage agency services and other partner introduction services increased significantly. In various places marriage agencies began making use of online video meeting facilities such as Zoom, in order for them to host virtual marriage introduction parties and online introductions.

See also
 Matchmaking
 Marriage market
 Mail-order bride

References 

Matchmaking